Neopleurotomoides distinctus is a species of sea snail, a marine gastropod mollusk in the family Raphitomidae.

Description

Distribution
This marine species occurs off Northwest France; also in the Mediterranean Sea, in the Ibero-Moroccan Gulf.

References

 Bouchet, P.; Warén, A. (1980). Revision of the North-East Atlantic bathyal and abyssal Turridae (Mollusca: Gastropoda). Journal of Molluscan Studies. Suppl. 8: 1-119
 Gofas, S.; Le Renard, J.; Bouchet, P. (2001). Mollusca. in: Costello, M.J. et al. (eds), European Register of Marine Species: a check-list of the marine species in Europe and a bibliography of guides to their identification. Patrimoines Naturels. 50: 180–213.

External links
 

distinctus
Gastropods described in 1980